Life Everlasting or Everlasting Life may refer to:

 Immortality, the ability to live forever
 Eternal life (Christianity), a Christian belief
 Life Everlasting (Corelli novel), a 1911 novel by Marie Corelli
 Life Everlasting (Keller novel), a 1934 novel by David H. Keller
 Everlasting Life, a 1998 album by Kim Burrell

See also 
 Eternal life (disambiguation)